Yu Qin (1284–1333) was a Chinese geographer of the Yuan dynasty. In 1319, he was appointed the official of Jinan to resolve the starvation problem caused by bad harvesting. He started to write the geography book Qi Sheng during this period, which was the oldest known geography book about Shandong Province.

References

Chinese geographers
1284 births
1333 deaths
Yuan dynasty politicians
Political office-holders in Shandong